Awut Deng Acuil is a South Sudanese politician who presently serves as the minister in the Ministry of General Education and Instruction in the Revitalised Transitional Government of National Unity (R-TGoNU). She is the first female Minister of Education for South Sudan and was previously Minister of Foreign Affairs and International Cooperation from August 2019 until March 2020.

Early life 
Awut Deng was born the daughter of Deng Achuil. Her father's tribe lived on the Nuer-Dinka border.

Education
Awut has a degree in political sciences from the Catholic University of Eastern Africa.

Career 
Early in her career, Deng as a leader of peace efforts. She participated in the New Sudan Council of Churches peace initiative. She was also instrumental in the 1999 Wunlit Peace Conference between the Nuer and Dinka. From 2000 to 2002 Deng traveled the world advocating for peace efforts in South Sudan to various world leaders. She was awarded the 2002 Interaction Humanitarian Award for her efforts for peace.

Deng participated in the peace talks in Kenya from 2002 to 2004 which led to the Comprehensive Peace Agreement in 2005. From 2005 to 2010 she held an appointed position to the Southern Sudan Legislative Assembly in Juba. She also served as a presidential adviser on gender and human rights from 2005 to 2009. Deng cofounded the Sudenese Catholic Bishops Regional Conference, the Sudenese Women's Association in Nairobi, and the Sudenese Women's Voice for Peace.

Appointment 
Awut  Deng Achuil was appointed by President Salva Kiir as a national minister of General Education and Instructions in March 2020 through a Republican decree.

Deng served as South Sudan's Minister of Labor and Public Service from 2009 to 2011, taking the role previously held by David Deng Athorbe. She was again appointed to the Cabinet of South Sudan  on 10 July 2011. She was sworn in as Minister for Labour, Public Service on 14 September 2011. As part of a new cabinet named in April 2016, Acuil was named Minister of Gender, Child and Social Welfare.

Deng has also been a member of parliament since 2010.

Deng served as Foreign Minister from August 2019 until March 2020, when she was replaced by Beatrice Wani-Noah. She was instead named as the new Minister for General Education and Instruction.

Other activities
 Global Partnership for Education (GPE), Alternate Member of the Board of Trustees (since 2020)

See also
 SPLM
 SPLA
 Cabinet of South Sudan

References

External links
Website of Government of South Sudan

Living people
21st-century South Sudanese women politicians
21st-century South Sudanese politicians
Foreign ministers of South Sudan
Women government ministers of South Sudan
Female foreign ministers
1962 births
Sudan People's Liberation Movement politicians